Kılıçkaya Dam  is a dam located 25 km north of town of Suşehri 158 km northeast of Sivas city in center east of Turkey and located on the Kelkit, a tributary of the Yeşilırmak River which  flows down along a large fault in the north east Anatolia than runs into the Black Sea.

Geology in the river basin, where many landslides can be observed, is of sedimentary formation.

References

Dams in Sivas Province
Hydroelectric power stations in Turkey
Dams completed in 1989